DUR or Dur may refer to:

 King Shaka International Airport, an airport north of Durban with IATA code DUR
 County Durham, a county in England with ISO 3166-2:GB code DUR
 Detroit United Railway, an interurban railway in southeast Michigan
 Drug Utilization Review, a review of a drug to determine effectiveness, potential dangers, problems with drug interaction, and other issues
 Dur, Iran (disambiguation)
 Durrington-on-Sea railway station, a railway station in Worthing, West Sussex with National Rail station code DUR
 The inscription on stop signs in Turkey

See also
Dir (disambiguation)
Dirr (disambiguation)
Durr (disambiguation)
Duerr (disambiguation)